Joseph Henyekane (20 October 1984 – 16 December 2014) was a South African footballer who played in the South African Premier Division for Bidvest Wits. He died in a car accident in 2014, four months before his brother, Richard, died in a separate car accident.

Career statistics

References

1984 births
2014 deaths
South African soccer players
Association football midfielders
South African Premier Division players
National First Division players
Lamontville Golden Arrows F.C. players
Mpumalanga Black Aces F.C. players
Bidvest Wits F.C. players
Roses United F.C. players
Road incident deaths in South Africa